James Sanders (1900–1981) was a New Zealand rugby league player who represented New Zealand.

Playing career
Sanders started his career in third grade with Addington in 1915. He spent his entire career with Addington apart from a few games for Hornby when Addington had no senior team. He captained Addington to their first title in 1923.

Sanders made his New Zealand debut in 1919 against Australia. In 1921 Sanders toured Australia for New Zealand under coach Jim Rukutai. He played for New Zealand in 1922 against New South Wales and was part of the 1926-1927 New Zealand tour of Great Britain that was marred by a players strike. He first played for the South Island in 1925 and in 1929 he captained them to their 23-13 victory over the North Island, the South Island's first.

Sanders rejected an offer from Halifax for the 1926-1927 season.

Later years
Sanders coached Addington in 1931 and later coached Canterbury and the South Island. He also served as a South Island and New Zealand selector in the 1930s.

References

New Zealand rugby league players
New Zealand national rugby league team players
Canterbury rugby league team players
South Island rugby league team players
Rugby league wingers
Rugby league centres
Rugby league five-eighths
Canterbury rugby league team coaches
South Island rugby league team coaches
1900 births
1981 deaths
New Zealand rugby league coaches
Addington Magpies players
Hornby Panthers players